This is a list of cover versions by music artists who have recorded one or more compositions written and originally recorded by American jazz pianist Vince Guaraldi (1928–76). This list also includes traditional songs recorded by Guaraldi covered by other artists who were faithful to Guaraldi's particular arrangement ("Hark! The Herald Angels Sing", "O Tannenbaum", "The Christmas Song", "Für Elise", "What Child Is This").

List

Further reading

References

External links
Vince Guaraldi at Concord Records
Vince Guaraldi at Five Cents Please.org by Derrick Bang 
Impressions of Vince: Commentary, discussions and random thoughts about San Francisco-born jazz pianist Vince Guaraldi, beloved by many — including those who recognize his music, but not his name — and affectionately known as Dr. Funk by Derrick Bang

Guaraldi
Guaraldi
Peanuts music